The following is a list of churches in Allerdale.

The following parishes have no active churches: Bewaldeth and Snittlegarth; Bothel and Threapland; Dundraw; Greysouthen; Holme Low; Oughterside and Allerby; Papcastle; Winscales; Woodside.

The district has an estimated 121 churches for 96,422 people, a ratio of one church for every 797 inhabitants.

Map of medieval parish churches
For the purposes of this map medieval is taken to be pre-1485. It is of note that Cumbria, unlike most parts of England, saw a sustained programme of church building during the 16th and 17th centuries as the more remote parts of the district were settled.

List

Defunct churches

References

Allerdale
Churches
 
Churches